Serra do Itajaí National Park or Itajaí Mountains National Park is a national park in the state of Santa Catarina, Brazil.

Location

The park is in the Atlantic Forest biome.
It was created by decree of 4 June 2004, modified by decree of 20 February 2006, and is administered by the Chico Mendes Institute for Biodiversity Conservation.
It covers parts of the municipalities of Ascurra, Apiúna, Blumenau, Botuverá, Gaspar, Guabiruba, Indaial, Presidente Nereu and Vidal Ramos in the state of Santa Catarina.

Conservation

The park is classified as IUCN protected area category II (national park).
It has the objectives of preserving natural ecosystems of great ecological relevance and scenic beauty, enabling scientific research, environmental education, outdoors recreation and eco-tourism.
Protected species in the park include cougar (Puma concolor), margay (Leopardus wiedii), vinaceous-breasted amazon (Amazona vinacea), white-necked hawk (Buteogallus lacernulatus), white-bearded antshrike (Biatas nigropectus) and Phylloscartes.

Notes

Sources

National parks of Brazil
Protected areas of Santa Catarina (state)
Protected areas of the Atlantic Forest